King George Island (Argentinian Spanish: Isla 25 de Mayo, Chilean Spanish: Isla Rey Jorge, Russian: Ватерло́о Vaterloo) is the largest of the South Shetland Islands, lying  off the coast of Antarctica in the Southern Ocean.  The island was named after King George III.

Geography
King George island has three major bays, Maxwell Bay, Admiralty Bay, and King George Bay. Admiralty Bay contains three fjords, and is protected as an Antarctic Specially Managed Area under the Protocol on Environmental Protection to the Antarctic Treaty.

History
The island was first claimed for Britain on 16 October 1819, formally annexed by Britain as part of the Falkland Islands Dependencies in 1908, and now as part of the separate British Antarctic Territory.  The Island was claimed by Chile in 1940, as part of the Chilean Antarctic Territory.  It was also claimed by Argentina in 1943, now as part of Argentine Antarctica, called by the Argentines Isla Veinticinco de Mayo (25 May) in honour of their National day.  The US and Russia do not recognize any Antarctic claim, and have formally reserved their right to claim Antarctic territories.

The island was discovered and named by the British explorer William Smith in 1819, who named it after the then King, George III. Over 90% of the island's surface is permanently glaciated. In 1821, 11 men of the sealing vessel Lord Melville survived the winter on the island, the first men to do so in Antarctica.

Life on the island
The coastal areas of the island are home to a comparatively diverse selection of vegetation and animal life, including elephant, Weddell, and leopard seals, and Adelie, chinstrap and gentoo penguins. Several other seabirds, including skuas and southern giant petrel, nest on this island during the summer months.

Human activity

Chilean scientists have claimed that Amerinds visited the area, due to stone artifacts recovered from bottom-sampling operations in Admiralty Bay; however, the artefacts—two arrowheads—were later found to have been planted.

Human habitation of King George Island is limited to research stations belonging to Argentina, Brazil, Chile, China, South Korea, Peru, Poland, Russia, Uruguay, and the United States.  Most of these stations are permanently staffed, carrying out research into areas as diverse as biology, ecology, geology, and palaeontology. Base Presidente Eduardo Frei Montalva, the Chilean Station on the Fildes Peninsula, is operated as a permanent village with an airstrip (with large hangar and control tower along with other buildings), cafeterias for personnel of its several agencies there, a bank, a post office and comfortable ranch-style family homes with children.  Chile (like Argentina and Great Britain) regards all of the Antarctic Peninsula and South Shetland Islands as part of that country's territory; however, the terms of the Antarctic Treaty allow Chile to colonize the Fildes Peninsula without overtly pursuing its territorial claims. The Chinese Great Wall base features an indoor multipurpose room which serves as a full-size basketball court.

In 2004, a Russian Orthodox church, Trinity Church, was opened on the island near Russia's Bellingshausen Station. The church, one of the southernmost in the world and one of the few permanent structures in Antarctica, is permanently staffed by a priest.

In October 2013, American heavy metal band Metallica announced that it would perform a concert sponsored by The Coca-Cola Company at Carlini Station heliport. The concert took place on 8 December 2013.

The first attempted murder in Antarctica occurred on the island in 2018 at Russia's Bellingshausen Station.

A small amount of specialised tourist activity also takes place during summer, including an annual marathon, known as the Antarctic marathon.

It was named from association with nearby Fildes Strait by the UK-APC in 1960.

Point Thomas lighthouse at Arctowski Station is the most southerly lighthouse of the world.

NOAA runs Lenie Base, a seasonal research station for penguin studies on Admiralty Bay. This small station, dubbed Copacabana, operates in the Antarctic summer only, but is used as a survival hut in the winter.

Climate
The Antarctic Peninsula and its nearby islands are considered to have the mildest living conditions in Antarctica. The island's climate is strongly influenced by the surrounding ocean. Under the Köppen system, it is one of the few locations in Antarctica classified as a tundra climate rather than an ice cap climate. With only 591.3 hours of sunshine per year, the weather is often unsettled and cloudy throughout the year with precipitation in the form of snow, rain and drizzle occurring often. On average, 729 mm of precipitation falls per year.

See also

References

Bibliography
 A.G.E. Jones, "Captain William Smith and the Discovery of New South Shetland", Geographical Journal, Vol. 141, No. 3 (November 1975), pp. 445–461
 Alan Gurney, Below the Convergence: Voyages Toward Antarctica, 1699–1839, Penguin Books, New York, 1998
 Revista de la Asociación Geológica Argentina 62 (1): pp. 35–43 Spanish
 E. Serrano. Espacios protegidos y política territorial en las islas Shetland del Sur (Antártida). Boletín de la A.G.E. N.º 31 – 2001, págs. 5–21

External links

The SCAR King George Island GIS Project provides an interactive map of the island.
Biodiversity at Ardley Island Small place near King George Island, special protected area.
Report From Antarctica: Countries Maneuver for Potential Future Land Grab

 
Islands of the South Shetland Islands
Seal hunting